Inesa Benediktovna Kozlovskaya (2 June 1927 in Harbin – 19 February 2020) was a Soviet Russian physiologist, Corresponding Member of the Russian Academy of Sciences, and Honored Scientist of the Russian Federation (1996).
She was a Doktor nauk of Medical Sciences, Professor, and was (since 1977) fellow researcher at the Institute of Biomedical Problems (IBMP). She was a laureate of the 2001 State Prize of the Russian Federation.

Career
In 1954, Kozlovskaya defended her Candidate's Dissertation.
From 1966 to 1971, Kozlovskaya attended Neal E. Miller's lab at Rockefeller University.
In 1976, she defended her doctoral dissertation.
She was elected a Corresponding Member of the Russian Academy of Sciences in 2000.
She was elected a Member of the International Academy of Astronautics.
She was a member of the Editorial Board for Human Physiology.

References

1927 births
2020 deaths
Soviet physiologists
Russian women scientists
Russian professors
Corresponding Members of the Russian Academy of Sciences
Honoured Scientists of the Russian Federation
State Prize of the Russian Federation laureates
Soviet expatriates in China
20th-century Russian women
Soviet women physicians